Finkelhor is a surname. Notable people with the surname include:

David Finkelhor (born 1947), American sociologist
Dorothy Finkelhor (1902–1988), American academic